Benedito Nunes (November 21, 1929 - February 27, 2011) was a Brazilian philosopher and literary critic. He was born Benedito José Viana da Costa Nunes in Belém, a major city in the north of Brazil, where he was a professor at the Federal University of Pará. He has also lectured at other universities in the south of Brazil, France and the United States. In 1987, he was awarded the Prêmio Jabuti, regarded as the most prestigious literary prize in Brazil. He was awarded again with the same prize in 2010, for the literary critic "A Clave do Poético". He was one of the most respected authorities in contemporary Brazilian culture, and a specialist in the literary work of Brazilian modernists such as Clarice Lispector. Benedito Nunes died in his hometown Belém on February 27, 2011.

Works

 O drama da linguagem - Uma leitura de Clarice Lispector, 1989;
 No tempo da narrativa, 1988;
 Introdução à Filosofia da Arte, 1989;
 O Dorso do Tigre (from the collection Debates- literary and philosophical essays), 1969;
 João Cabral de Melo Neto (from the collection Poetas Modernos do Brasil), 1974;
 Oswald Canibal (from the collection Elos), 1979;
 Passagem para o poético - Filosofia e Poesia em Heidegger, 1968;
 A Filosofia Contemporânea, 1991;
 No tempo do niilismo e outros ensaios, 1993;
 Crivo de papel (literary and philosophical essays), 1998;
 Hermenêutica e poesia - O pensamento poético, 1999;
 Dois Ensaios e Duas Lembranças, 2000;
 O Nietzsche de Heidegger, 2000;
 Heidegger e Ser e Tempo, 2002.

Notes

External links
 Interview with Benedito Nunes in the page of Federal University of Pará (in Portuguese)
 agrobase concursos (in Portuguese)
 concursos pe (in Portuguese)

1929 births
2011 deaths
People from Belém
Brazilian philosophers